Ignacio Tuhuteru (born 23 August 1973 in Zaandam) is a retired Dutch footballer of Moluccan-Indonesian origin who played as a winger for Ajax, RBC Roosendaal, Dalian Haichang, Sembawang Rangers, FC Zwolle, SC Heerenveen, FC Groningen and Go Ahead Eagles.

References

  Player profile at Dutch Players Abroad
  Player profile at Ronald Zwiers 

1973 births
Living people
Dutch footballers
Dutch expatriate footballers
Eredivisie players
Eerste Divisie players
PEC Zwolle players
SC Heerenveen players
FC Groningen players
Go Ahead Eagles players
AFC Ajax players
RBC Roosendaal players
Dalian Shide F.C. players
Dutch people of Moluccan descent
Footballers from Zaanstad
Expatriate footballers in China
Dutch people of Indonesian descent
Association football midfielders